The Hermosillo Sonora Mexico Temple is the 72nd operating temple of the Church of Jesus Christ of Latter-day Saints (LDS Church).

Hermosillo, capital of the northern state of Sonora, was one of the first areas in Mexico to have Mormon missionaries.

History
The church announced the building of the temple in Hermosillo on 20 July 1998. LDS Church president Gordon B. Hinckley dedicated the Hermosillo Sonora Mexico Temple on February 27, 2000.

In 2020, like all the church's other temples, the Hermosillo Sonora Mexico Temple was closed in response to the coronavirus pandemic.

See also

 Comparison of temples of The Church of Jesus Christ of Latter-day Saints
 List of temples of The Church of Jesus Christ of Latter-day Saints
 List of temples of The Church of Jesus Christ of Latter-day Saints by geographic region
 Temple architecture (Latter-day Saints)
 The Church of Jesus Christ of Latter-day Saints in Mexico

References

Additional reading

External links
Hermosillo Sonora Mexico Temple Official site
Hermosillo Sonora Mexico Temple at ChurchofJesusChristTemples.org

20th-century Latter Day Saint temples
Buildings and structures in Sonora
Hermosillo
Temples (LDS Church) completed in 2000
Temples (LDS Church) in Mexico
2000 establishments in Mexico